Oulunkaari is a subdivision of Northern Ostrobothnia and one of the Sub-regions of Finland since 2009.

Municipalities
Ii
Pudasjärvi
Simo
Utajärvi
Vaala

Sub-regions of Finland
Geography of North Ostrobothnia